Gulabganj (Village ID 481751) is a town in Vidisha district in Madhya Pradesh state in India. According to the 2011 census it has a population of 1844 living in 385 households. Its main agriculture product is soybean growing.

References

Cities and towns in Vidisha district